Belorusskaya Lesnaya Gazeta is a Russian language newspaper published in Belarus. It appears in the United States as an archived news version.

References

Russian-language newspapers published in Belarus